Ghalib Khurd, ਗਾਲਿਬ ਖੁਰਦ is a village in Punjab, 5 miles northwest of Jagraon, in India.

References

  
Villages in Ludhiana district